Valley Farm Pit, Sudbourne is a  geological Site of Special Scientific Interest north of Orford in Suffolk. It is a Geological Conservation Review site, and in the Suffolk Coast and Heaths Area of Outstanding Natural Beauty. 

A shelly, fossilerous Pleistocene layer lies unconformably above a Pliocene Coralline Crag Formation layer. It is described by Natural England as important both for sedimentological studies and for understanding the local relationship between the Pliocene and the Pleistocene.

The site is private land with no public access.

References

Sites of Special Scientific Interest in Suffolk
Geological Conservation Review sites